Rubicon was a California funk rock band, whose "I'm Gonna Take Care of Everything" spent 11 weeks on the Billboard Hot 100 in 1978, peaking at number 28.

History
Rubicon was formed in San Francisco by Jerry Martini, who was an original member of Sly & the Family Stone. Other members of the group included Greg Eckler (vocals, drums), Brad Gillis (guitar), Max Haskett (lead vocals, horns), Dennis Marcellino (sax, vocals), Jim Pugh (keyboards), Jack Blades (bass) and Johnny Colla (guitar). Their first album, the self-titled Rubicon, released in 1978, generated their only chart single.  They released a second album in 1979, entitled America Dreams, before disbanding. Drummer Kelly Keagy was brought on as a touring drummer before the breakup. Keagy, Gillis and Blades went on to form the successful band Night Ranger. Johnny Colla would become a founding member of Huey Lewis and the News.

Rubicon reformed in the early 1990s as a progressive rock band with Greg Eckler (drums), Chuck Crenshaw (keyboards), J.P. Michaels (vocals, bass guitar), David Christians (vocals, lead guitar), and Randy Newhouse (guitar). This version of Rubicon produced one CD called Best of Rubicon, and a single "Whipping Boy", written by Michaels and Crenshaw.

Trumpeter/vocalist Max Haskett died on September 15, 1999, of pancreatic cancer.

Discography

Studio albums
Rubicon (1978)
America Dreams (1979)

See also
California Jam II

References

Musical groups from San Francisco
American funk musical groups
Funk rock musical groups
Progressive rock musical groups from California
20th Century Fox Records artists